The syntax of Java is the set of rules defining how a Java program is written and interpreted.

The syntax is mostly derived from C and C++. Unlike in C++, in Java there are no global functions or variables, but there are data members which are also regarded as global variables. All code belongs to classes and all values are objects. The only exception is the primitive types, which are not represented by a class instance for performance reasons (though can be automatically converted to objects and vice versa via autoboxing). Some features like operator overloading or unsigned integer types are omitted to simplify the language and to avoid possible programming mistakes.

The Java syntax has been gradually extended in the course of numerous major JDK releases, and now supports capabilities such as generic programming and function literals (called lambda expressions in Java). Since 2017, a new JDK version is released twice a year, with each release bringing incremental improvements to the language.

Basics

Identifier
An identifier is the name of an element in the code. There are certain standard naming conventions to follow when selecting names for elements. Identifiers in Java are case-sensitive.

An identifier can contain:
 Any Unicode character that is a letter (including numeric letters like Roman numerals) or digit.
 Currency sign (such as ¥).
 Connecting punctuation character (such as _).

An identifier cannot:
 Start with a digit.
 Be equal to a reserved keyword, null literal or boolean literal.

Keywords

Literals

Integer literals are of int type by default unless long type is specified by appending L or l suffix to the literal, e.g. 367L.

Variables
Variables are identifiers associated with values. They are declared by writing the variable's type and name, and are optionally initialized in the same statement by assigning a value.

int count;      //Declaring an uninitialized variable called 'count', of type 'int'
count = 35;     //Initializing the variable
int count = 35; //Declaring and initializing the variable at the same time

Multiple variables of the same type can be declared and initialized in one statement using comma as a delimiter.
int a, b;         //Declaring multiple variables of the same type
int a = 2, b = 3; //Declaring and initializing multiple variables of the same type

Since Java 10 it has become possible to infer types for the variables automatically by using var.

// stream will have the FileOutputStream type as inferred from its initializer
var stream = new FileOutputStream("file.txt");

// An equivalent declaration with an explicit type
FileOutputStream stream = new FileOutputStream("file.txt");

Code blocks

The separators  and } signify a code block and a new scope. Class members and the body of a method are examples of what can live inside these braces in various contexts.

Inside of method bodies, braces may be used to create new scopes, as follows:

void doSomething() {
    int a;

    {
        int b;
        a = 1;
    }

    a = 2;
    b = 3; // Illegal because the variable b is declared in an inner scope..
}

Comments
Java has three kinds of comments: traditional comments, end-of-line comments and documentation comments.

Traditional comments, also known as block comments, start with /* and end with */, they may span across multiple lines. This type of comment was derived from C and C++.

/* This is a multi-line comment.
It may occupy more than one line. */

End-of-line comments start with // and extend to the end of the current line. This comment type is also present in C++ and in modern C.
// This is an end-of-line comment

Documentation comments in the source files are processed by the Javadoc tool to generate documentation. This type of comment is identical to traditional comments, except it starts with /** and follows conventions defined by the Javadoc tool. Technically, these comments are a special kind of traditional comment and they are not specifically defined in the language specification.
/**
 * This is a documentation comment.
 * 
 * @author John Doe
 */

Universal types

Classes in the package java.lang are implicitly imported into every program, as long as no explicitly-imported types have the same names. Important ones include:

java.lang.Object Java's top type. Superclass of all classes that do not declare a parent class. All values can be converted to this type, although for primitive values this involves autoboxing.
java.lang.String Java's basic string type. Immutable. Some methods treat each UTF-16 code unit as a "character", but methods to convert to an int[] that is effectively UTF-32 are also available.
java.lang.Throwable supertype of everything that can be thrown or caught with Java's throw and catch statements.

Program structure
Java applications consist of collections of classes. Classes exist in packages but can also be nested inside other classes.

main method
Every Java application must have an entry point. This is true of both graphical interface applications and console applications. The entry point is the main method. There can be more than one class with a main method, but the main class is always defined externally (for example, in a manifest file). The main method along with the main class must be declared public. The method must be static and is passed command-line arguments as an array of strings. Unlike C++ or C#, it never returns a value and must return void.
public static void main(String[] args) {
}

Packages
Packages are a part of a class name and they are used to group and/or distinguish named entities from other ones. Another purpose of packages is to govern code access together with access modifiers. For example, java.io.InputStream is a fully qualified class name for the class InputStream which is located in the package java.io.

A package is declared at the start of the file with the package declaration:

package myapplication.mylibrary;

public class MyClass {
}

Classes with the public modifier must be placed in the files with the same name and  extension and put into nested folders corresponding to the package name. The above class myapplication.mylibrary.MyClass will have the following path: myapplication/mylibrary/MyClass.java.

Import declaration

Type import declaration

A type import declaration allows a named type to be referred to by a simple name rather than the full name that includes the package. Import declarations can be single type import declarations or import-on-demand declarations. Import declarations must be placed at the top of a code file after the package declaration.

package myPackage;

import java.util.Random; // Single type declaration

public class ImportsTest {
    public static void main(String[] args) {
        /* The following line is equivalent to
         * java.util.Random random = new java.util.Random();
         * It would've been incorrect without the import.
         */
        Random random = new Random();
    }
}

Import-on-demand declarations are mentioned in the code. A "type import" imports all the types of the package. A "static import" imports members of the package.

import java.util.*;  /*This form of importing classes makes all classes
    in package java.util available by name, could be used instead of the
    import declaration in the previous example. */
import java.*; /*This statement is legal, but does nothing, since there
    are no classes directly in package java. All of them are in packages
    within package java. This does not import all available classes.*/

Static import declaration

This type of declaration has been available since J2SE 5.0. Static import declarations allow access to static members defined in another class, interface, annotation, or enum; without specifying the class name:

import static java.lang.System.out; //'out' is a static field in java.lang.System

public class HelloWorld {
    public static void main(String[] args) {
        /* The following line is equivalent to:
   System.out.println("Hi World!");

           and would have been incorrect without the import declaration. */
        out.println("Hello World!");
    }
}

Import-on-demand declarations allow to import all the fields of the type:

import static java.lang.System.*;
    /* This form of declaration makes all
       fields in the java.lang.System class available by name, and may be used instead
       of the import declaration in the previous example. */

Enum constants may also be used with static import. For example, this enum is in the package called screen:

public enum ColorName {
    RED, BLUE, GREEN
};

It is possible to use static import declarations in another class to retrieve the enum constants:

import screen.ColorName;
import static screen.ColorName.*;

public class Dots {
    /* The following line is equivalent to 'ColorName foo = ColorName.RED',
       and it would have been incorrect without the static import. */
    ColorName foo = RED;

    void shift() {
        /* The following line is equivalent to:

           if (foo == ColorName.RED) foo = ColorName.BLUE; */
        if (foo == RED) foo = BLUE;
    }
}

Operators
Operators in Java are similar to those in C++. However, there is no delete operator due to garbage collection mechanisms in Java, and there are no operations on pointers since Java does not support them. Another difference is that Java has an unsigned right shift operator (>>>), while C's right shift operator's signedness is type-dependent. Operators in Java cannot be overloaded.

Control structures

Conditional statements

if statement
if statements in Java are similar to those in C and use the same syntax:
if (i == 3) doSomething();

if statement may include optional else block, in which case it becomes an if-then-else statement:
if (i == 2) {
    doSomething();
} else {
    doSomethingElse();
}

Like C, else-if construction does not involve any special keywords, it is formed as a sequence of separate if-then-else statements:
if (i == 3) {
    doSomething();
} else if (i == 2) {
    doSomethingElse();
} else {
    doSomethingDifferent();
}

Also, note that the ?: operator can be used in place of simple if statement, for example
int a = 1;
int b = 2;
int minVal = (a < b) ? a : b;

switch statement
Switch statements in Java can use byte, short, char, and int (note: not long) primitive data types or their corresponding wrapper types. Starting with J2SE 5.0, it is possible to use enum types. Starting with Java SE 7, it is possible to use Strings. Other reference types cannot be used in switch statements.

Possible values are listed using case labels. These labels in Java may contain only constants (including enum constants and string constants). Execution will start after the label corresponding to the expression inside the brackets. An optional default label may be present to declare that the code following it will be executed if none of the case labels correspond to the expression.

Code for each label ends with the break keyword. It is possible to omit it causing the execution to proceed to the next label, however, a warning will usually be reported during compilation.

switch (ch) {
    case 'A':
        doSomething(); // Triggered if ch == 'A'
        break;
    case 'B':
    case 'C':
        doSomethingElse(); // Triggered if ch == 'B' or ch == 'C'
        break;
    default:
        doSomethingDifferent(); // Triggered in any other case
        break;
}

switch expressions

Since Java 14 it has become possible to use switch expressions, which use the new arrow syntax:

var result = switch (ch) {
    case 'A' -> Result.GREAT;
    case 'B', 'C' -> Result.FINE;
    default -> throw new ThisIsNoGoodException();
};

Alternatively, there is a possibility to express the same with the yield statement, although it is recommended to prefer the arrow syntax because it avoids the problem of accidental fall throughs.

var result = switch (ch) {
    case 'A':
        yield Result.GREAT;
    case 'B':
    case 'C':
        yield Result.FINE;
    default:
        throw new ThisIsNoGoodException();
};

Iteration statements
Iteration statements are statements that are repeatedly executed when a given condition is evaluated as true. Since J2SE 5.0, Java has four forms of such statements.

while loop
In the while loop, the test is done before each iteration.

while (i < 10) {
    doSomething();
}

do ... while loop
In the do ... while loop, the test is done after each iteration. Consequently, the code is always executed at least once.

// doSomething() is called at least once
do {
    doSomething();
} while (i < 10);

for loop
for loops in Java include an initializer, a condition and a counter expression. It is possible to include several expressions of the same kind using comma as delimiter (except in the condition). However, unlike C, the comma is just a delimiter and not an operator.

for (int i = 0; i < 10; i++) {
    doSomething();
}
 
// A more complex loop using two variables
for (int i = 0, j = 9; i < 10; i++, j -= 3) {
    doSomething();
}

Like C, all three expressions are optional. The following loop is infinite:
for (;;) {
    doSomething();
}

Enhanced for loop

Enhanced for loops have been available since J2SE 5.0. This type of loop uses built-in iterators over arrays and collections to return each item in the given collection. Every element is returned and reachable in the context of the code block. When the block is executed, the next item is returned until there are no items remaining. Unlike C#, this kind of loop does not involve a special keyword, but instead uses a different notation style.

for (int i : intArray) {
    doSomething(i);
}

Jump statements

Labels
Labels are given points in code used by break and continue statements. Note that the Java goto keyword cannot be used to jump to specific points in the code.

start:
someMethod();

break statement
The break statement breaks out of the closest loop or switch statement. Execution continues in the statement after the terminated statement, if any.

for (int i = 0; i < 10; i++) {
    while (true) {
        break;
    }
    // Will break to this point
}

It is possible to break out of the outer loop using labels:

outer:
for (int i = 0; i < 10; i++) {
    while (true) {
        break outer;
    }
}
// Will break to this point

continue statement
The continue statement discontinues the current iteration of the current control statement and begins the next iteration. The following while loop in the code below reads characters by calling getChar(), skipping the statements in the body of the loop if the characters are spaces:

int ch;
while (ch == getChar()) {
    if (ch == ' ') {
        continue; // Skips the rest of the while-loop
    }

    // Rest of the while-loop, will not be reached if ch == ' '
    doSomething();
}

Labels can be specified in continue statements and break statements:

outer:
for (String str : stringsArr) {
    char[] strChars = str.toCharArray();
    for (char ch : strChars) {
        if (ch == ' ') {
            /* Continues the outer cycle and the next
            string is retrieved from stringsArr */
            continue outer;
        }
        doSomething(ch);
    }
}

return statement
The return statement is used to end method execution and to return a value. A value returned by the method is written after the return keyword. If the method returns anything but void, it must use the return statement to return some value.

void doSomething(boolean streamClosed) {
    // If streamClosed is true, execution is stopped
    if (streamClosed) {
        return;
    }
    readFromStream();
}

int calculateSum(int a, int b) {
    int result = a + b;
    return result;
}

return statement ends execution immediately, except for one case: if the statement is encountered within a try block and it is complemented by a finally, control is passed to the finally block.

void doSomething(boolean streamClosed) {
    try {
        if (streamClosed) {
            return;
        }
        readFromStream();
    } finally {
        /* Will be called last even if 
        readFromStream() was not called */
        freeResources();
    }
}

Exception handling statements

try-catch-finally statements
Exceptions are managed within try ... catch blocks.

try {
    // Statements that may throw exceptions
    methodThrowingExceptions();
} catch (Exception ex) {
    // Exception caught and handled here
    reportException(ex);
} finally {
    // Statements always executed after the try/catch blocks
    freeResources();
}

The statements within the try block are executed, and if any of them throws an exception, execution of the block is discontinued and the exception is handled by the catch block. There may be multiple catch blocks, in which case the first block with an exception variable whose type matches the type of the thrown exception is executed.

Java SE 7 also introduced multi-catch clauses besides uni-catch clauses. This type of catch clauses allows Java to handle different types of exceptions in a single block provided they are not subclasses of each other.

try {
    methodThrowingExceptions();
} catch (IOException | IllegalArgumentException ex) {
    //Both IOException and IllegalArgumentException will be caught and handled here
    reportException(ex);
}

If no catch block matches the type of the thrown exception, the execution of the outer block (or method) containing the try ... catch statement is discontinued, and the exception is passed up and outside the containing block (or method). The exception is propagated upwards through the call stack until a matching catch block is found within one of the currently active methods. If the exception propagates all the way up to the top-most main method without a matching catch block being found, a textual description of the exception is written to the standard output stream.

The statements within the finally block are always executed after the try and catch blocks, whether or not an exception was thrown and even if a return statement was reached. Such blocks are useful for providing clean-up code that is guaranteed to always be executed.

The catch and finally blocks are optional, but at least one or the other must be present following the try block.

try-with-resources statements

try-with-resources statements are a special type of try-catch-finally statements introduced as an implementation of the dispose pattern in Java SE 7. In a try-with-resources statement the try keyword is followed by initialization of one or more resources that are released automatically when the try block execution is finished. Resources must implement java.lang.AutoCloseable. try-with-resources statements are not required to have a catch or finally block unlike normal try-catch-finally statements.

try (FileOutputStream fos = new FileOutputStream("filename");
    XMLEncoder xEnc = new XMLEncoder(fos)) {
    xEnc.writeObject(object);
} catch (IOException ex) {
    Logger.getLogger(Serializer.class.getName()).log(Level.SEVERE, null, ex);
}

Since Java 9 it is possible to use already declared variables:

FileOutputStream fos = new FileOutputStream("filename");
XMLEncoder xEnc = new XMLEncoder(fos);
try (fos; xEnc) {
    xEnc.writeObject(object);
} catch (IOException ex) {
    Logger.getLogger(Serializer.class.getName()).log(Level.SEVERE, null, ex);
}

throw statement
The throw statement is used to throw an exception and end the execution of the block or method. The thrown exception instance is written after the throw statement.

void methodThrowingExceptions(Object obj) {
    if (obj == null) {
        // Throws exception of NullPointerException type
        throw new NullPointerException();
    }
    // Will not be called, if object is null
    doSomethingWithObject(obj);
}

Thread concurrency control
Java has built-in tools for multi-thread programming. For the purposes of thread synchronization the synchronized statement is included in Java language.

To make a code block synchronized, it is preceded by the synchronized keyword followed by the lock object inside the brackets. When the executing thread reaches the synchronized block, it acquires a mutual exclusion lock, executes the block, then releases the lock. No threads may enter this block until the lock is released. Any non-null reference type may be used as the lock.

/* Acquires lock on someObject. It must be of
a reference type and must be non-null */
synchronized (someObject) {
    // Synchronized statements
}

assert statement
assert statements have been available since J2SE 1.4. These types of statements are used to make assertions in the source code, which can be turned on and off during execution for specific classes or packages. To declare an assertion the assert keyword is used followed by a conditional expression. If it evaluates to false when the statement is executed, an exception is thrown. This statement can include a colon followed by another expression, which will act as the exception's detail message.

// If n equals 0, AssertionError is thrown
assert n != 0;
/* If n equals 0, AssertionError will be thrown
with the message after the colon */
assert n != 0 : "n was equal to zero";

Primitive types
Primitive types in Java include integer types, floating-point numbers, UTF-16 code units and a boolean type. There are no unsigned types in Java except char type, which is used to represent UTF-16 code units. The lack of unsigned types is offset by introducing unsigned right shift operation (>>>), which is not present in C++. Nevertheless, criticisms have been leveled about the lack of compatibility with C and C++ this causes. 

char does not necessarily correspond to a single character. It may represent a part of a surrogate pair, in which case Unicode code point is represented by a sequence of two char values.

Boxing and unboxing
This language feature was introduced in J2SE 5.0. Boxing is the operation of converting a value of a primitive type into a value of a corresponding reference type, which serves as a wrapper for this particular primitive type. Unboxing is the reverse operation of converting a value of a reference type (previously boxed) into a value of a corresponding primitive type. Neither operation requires an explicit conversion.

Example:
int foo = 42; // Primitive type
Integer bar = foo; /* foo is boxed to bar, bar is of Integer type,
                      which serves as a wrapper for int */
int foo2 = bar; // Unboxed back to primitive type

Reference types
Reference types include class types, interface types, and array types. When the constructor is called, an object is created on the heap and a reference is assigned to the variable. When a variable of an object gets out of scope, the reference is broken and when there are no references left, the object gets marked as garbage. The garbage collector then collects and destroys it some time afterwards.

A reference variable is null when it does not reference any object.

Arrays
Arrays in Java are created at runtime, just like class instances. Array length is defined at creation and cannot be changed.

int[] numbers = new int[5];
numbers[0] = 2;
numbers[1] = 5;
int x = numbers[0];

Initializers

// Long syntax
int[] numbers = new int[] {20, 1, 42, 15, 34};
// Short syntax
int[] numbers2 = {20, 1, 42, 15, 34};

Multi-dimensional arrays
In Java, multi-dimensional arrays are represented as arrays of arrays. Technically, they are represented by arrays of references to other arrays.

int[][] numbers = new int[3][3];
numbers[1][2] = 2;

int[][] numbers2 = {{2, 3, 2}, {1, 2, 6}, {2, 4, 5}};

Due to the nature of the multi-dimensional arrays, sub-arrays can vary in length, so multi-dimensional arrays are not bound to be rectangular unlike C:
int[][] numbers = new int[2][]; //Initialization of the first dimension only

numbers[0] = new int[3];
numbers[1] = new int[2];

Classes
Classes are fundamentals of an object-oriented language such as Java. They contain members that store and manipulate data. Classes are divided into top-level and nested. Nested classes are classes placed inside another class that may access the private members of the enclosing class. Nested classes include member classes (which may be defined with the static modifier for simple nesting or without it for inner classes), local classes and anonymous classes.

Declaration

Instantiation
Non-static members of a class define the types of the instance variables and methods, which are related to the objects created from that class. To create these objects, the class must be instantiated by using the new operator and calling the class constructor.

Foo foo = new Foo();

Accessing members
(dot) operator.

Accessing an instance member
Instance members can be accessed through the name of a variable.

String foo = "Hello";
String bar = foo.toUpperCase();

Accessing a static class member
Static members are accessed by using the name of the class or any other type. This does not require the creation of a class instance. Static members are declared using the static modifier.

public class Foo {
    public static void doSomething() {
    }
}

// Calling the static method
Foo.doSomething();

Modifiers
Modifiers are keywords used to modify declarations of types and type members. Most notably there is a sub-group containing the access modifiers.

 abstract - Specifies that a class only serves as a base class and cannot be instantiated.
 static - Used only for member classes, specifies that the member class does not belong to a specific instance of the containing class.
 final - Classes marked as final cannot be extended from and cannot have any subclasses.
 strictfp - Specifies that all floating-point operations must be carried out conforming to IEEE 754 and forbids using enhanced precision to store intermediate results.

Access modifiers
The access modifiers, or inheritance modifiers, set the accessibility of classes, methods, and other members. Members marked as public can be reached from anywhere. If a class or its member does not have any modifiers, default access is assumed.

public class Foo {
    int go() {
        return 0;
    }

    private class Bar {
    }
}

The following table shows whether code within a class has access to the class or method depending on the accessing class location and the modifier for the accessed class or class member:

Constructors and initializers
A constructor is a special method called when an object is initialized. Its purpose is to initialize the members of the object. The main differences between constructors and ordinary methods are that constructors are called only when an instance of the class is created and never return anything. Constructors are declared as common methods, but they are named after the class and no return type is specified:

class Foo {
    String str;

    Foo() { // Constructor with no arguments

        // Initialization
    }

    Foo(String str) { // Constructor with one argument
        this.str = str;
    }
}

Initializers are blocks of code that are executed when a class or an instance of a class is created. There are two kinds of initializers, static initializers and instance initializers.

Static initializers initialize static fields when the class is created. They are declared using the static keyword:

class Foo {
    static {
        // Initialization
    }
}

A class is created only once. Therefore, static initializers are not called more than once. On the contrary, instance initializers are automatically called before the call to a constructor every time an instance of the class is created. Unlike constructors instance initializers cannot take any arguments and generally they cannot throw any checked exceptions (except in several special cases). Instance initializers are declared in a block without any keywords:

class Foo {
    {
        // Initialization
    }
}

Since Java has a garbage collection mechanism, there are no destructors. However, every object has a finalize() method called prior to garbage collection, which can be overridden to implement finalization.

Methods
All the statements in Java must reside within methods. Methods are similar to functions except they belong to classes. A method has a return value, a name and usually some parameters initialized when it is called with some arguments. Similar to C++, methods returning nothing have return type declared as void. Unlike in C++, methods in Java are not allowed to have default argument values and methods are usually overloaded instead.

class Foo {
    int bar(int a, int b) {
        return (a*2) + b;
    }

    /* Overloaded method with the same name but different set of arguments */
    int bar(int a) {
        return a*2;
    }
}

A method is called using . notation on an object, or in the case of a static method, also on the name of a class.

Foo foo = new Foo();
int result = foo.bar(7, 2); // Non-static method is called on foo

int finalResult = Math.abs(result); // Static method call

The throws keyword indicates that a method throws an exception. All checked exceptions must be listed in a comma-separated list.
void openStream() throws IOException, myException { // Indicates that IOException may be thrown
}

Modifiers
 abstract - Abstract methods can be present only in abstract classes, such methods have no body and must be overridden in a subclass unless it is abstract itself.
 static - Makes the method static and accessible without creation of a class instance. However static methods cannot access non-static members in the same class.
 final - Declares that the method cannot be overridden in a subclass.
 native - Indicates that this method is implemented through JNI in platform-dependent code. Actual implementation happens outside Java code, and such methods have no body.
 strictfp - Declares strict conformance to IEEE 754 in carrying out floating-point operations.
 synchronized - Declares that a thread executing this method must acquire monitor. For synchronized methods the monitor is the class instance or java.lang.Class if the method is static.
 Access modifiers - Identical to those used with classes.

Varargs
This language feature was introduced in J2SE 5.0. The last argument of the method may be declared as a variable arity parameter, in which case the method becomes a variable arity method (as opposed to fixed arity methods) or simply varargs method. This allows one to pass a variable number of values, of the declared type, to the method as parameters - including no parameters. These values will be available inside the method as an array.

void printReport(String header, int... numbers) { //numbers represents varargs
    System.out.println(header);
    for (int num : numbers) {
        System.out.println(num);
    }
}

// Calling varargs method
printReport("Report data", 74, 83, 25, 96);

Fields
Fields, or class variables, can be declared inside the class body to store data.

class Foo {
    double bar;
}

Fields can be initialized directly when declared.

class Foo {
    double bar = 2.3;
}

Modifiers
 static - Makes the field a static member.
 final - Allows the field to be initialized only once in a constructor or inside initialization block or during its declaration, whichever is earlier.
 transient - Indicates that this field will not be stored during serialization.
 volatile - If a field is declared volatile, it is ensured that all threads see a consistent value for the variable.

Inheritance
Classes in Java can only inherit from one class. A class can be derived from any class that is not marked as final. Inheritance is declared using the extends keyword. A class can reference itself using the this keyword and its direct superclass using the super keyword.

class Foo {

}

class Foobar extends Foo {

}

If a class does not specify its superclass, it implicitly inherits from java.lang.Object class. Thus all classes in Java are subclasses of Object class.

If the superclass does not have a constructor without parameters the subclass must specify in its constructors what constructor of the superclass to use. For example:

class Foo {
    public Foo(int n) {
        // Do something with n
    }
}

class Foobar extends Foo {
    private int number;
    // Superclass does not have constructor without parameters
    // so we have to specify what constructor of our superclass to use and how

    public Foobar(int number) {
        super(number);
        this.number = number;
    }
}

Overriding methods
Unlike C++, all non-final methods in Java are virtual and can be overridden by the inheriting classes.

class Operation {
    public int doSomething() {
        return 0;
    }
}

class NewOperation extends Operation {
    @Override
    public int doSomething() {
        return 1;
    }
}

Abstract classes

An   Abstract Class is a class that is incomplete, or to be considered incomplete.
A class C has abstract methods if any of the following is true:

 C explicitly contains a declaration of an abstract method.
 Any of C's superclasses has an abstract method and C neither declares nor inherits a method that implements it.
 A direct superinterface of C declares or inherits a method (which is therefore necessarily abstract) and C neither declares nor inherits a method that implements it.
 A subclass of an abstract class that is not itself abstract may be instantiated, resulting in the execution of a constructor for the abstract class and, therefore, the execution of the field initializers for instance variables of that class.

package org.dwwwp.test;

/**
 * @author jcrypto
 */
public class AbstractClass {
    private static final String hello;

    static {
        System.out.println(AbstractClass.class.getName() + ": static block runtime");
        hello = "hello from " + AbstractClass.class.getName();
    }

    {
        System.out.println(AbstractClass.class.getName() + ": instance block runtime");
    }

    public AbstractClass() {
        System.out.println(AbstractClass.class.getName() + ": constructor runtime");
    }

    public static void hello() {
        System.out.println(hello);
    }
}
package org.dwwwp.test;

/**
 * @author jcrypto
 */
public class CustomClass extends AbstractClass {

    static {
        System.out.println(CustomClass.class.getName() + ": static block runtime");
    }

    {
        System.out.println(CustomClass.class.getName() + ": instance block runtime");
    }

    public CustomClass() {
        System.out.println(CustomClass.class.getName() + ": constructor runtime");
    }

    public static void main(String[] args) {
        CustomClass nc = new CustomClass();
        hello();
        //AbstractClass.hello();//also valid
    }
}

Output:
org.dwwwp.test.AbstractClass: static block runtime
org.dwwwp.test.CustomClass: static block runtime
org.dwwwp.test.AbstractClass: instance block runtime
org.dwwwp.test.AbstractClass: constructor runtime
org.dwwwp.test.CustomClass: instance block runtime
org.dwwwp.test.CustomClass: constructor runtime
hello from org.dwwwp.test.AbstractClass

Enumerations
This language feature was introduced in J2SE 5.0. Technically enumerations are a kind of class containing enum constants in its body. Each enum constant defines an instance of the enum type. Enumeration classes cannot be instantiated anywhere except in the enumeration class itself.

enum Season {
    WINTER, SPRING, SUMMER, AUTUMN
}

Enum constants are allowed to have constructors, which are called when the class is loaded:

public enum Season {
    WINTER("Cold"), SPRING("Warmer"), SUMMER("Hot"), AUTUMN("Cooler");

    Season(String description) {
        this.description = description;
    }

    private final String description;

    public String getDescription() {
        return description;
    }
}

Enumerations can have class bodies, in which case they are treated like anonymous classes extending the enum class:

public enum Season {
    WINTER {
        String getDescription() {return "cold";}
    },
    SPRING {
        String getDescription() {return "warmer";}
    },
    SUMMER {
        String getDescription() {return "hot";}
    },
    FALL {
        String getDescription() {return "cooler";}
    };
}

Interfaces
Interfaces are types which contain no fields and usually define a number of methods without an actual implementation. They are useful to define a contract with any number of different implementations. Every interface is implicitly abstract. Interface methods are allowed to have a subset of access modifiers depending on the language version, strictfp, which has the same effect as for classes, and also static since Java SE 8.

interface ActionListener {
    int ACTION_ADD = 0;
    int ACTION_REMOVE = 1;
 
    void actionSelected(int action);
}

Implementing an interface
An interface is implemented by a class using the implements keyword. It is allowed to implement more than one interface, in which case they are written after implements keyword in a comma-separated list. Class implementing an interface must override all its methods, otherwise it must be declared as abstract.

interface RequestListener {
    int requestReceived();
}

class ActionHandler implements ActionListener, RequestListener {
    public void actionSelected(int action) {
    }

    public int requestReceived() {
    }
}

//Calling method defined by interface
RequestListener listener = new ActionHandler(); /*ActionHandler can be
                                   represented as RequestListener...*/
listener.requestReceived(); /*...and thus is known to implement
                            requestReceived() method*/

Functional interfaces and lambda expressions

These features were introduced with the release of Java SE 8. An interface automatically becomes a functional interface if it defines only one method. In this case an implementation can be represented as a lambda expression instead of implementing it in a new class, thus greatly simplifying writing code in the functional style. Functional interfaces can optionally be annotated with the @FunctionalInterface annotation, which will tell the compiler to check whether the interface actually conforms to a definition of a functional interface.

// A functional interface
@FunctionalInterface
interface Calculation {
    int calculate(int someNumber, int someOtherNumber);
}

// A method which accepts this interface as a parameter
int runCalculation(Calculation calculation) {
    return calculation.calculate(1, 2);
}

// Using a lambda to call the method
runCalculation((number, otherNumber) -> number + otherNumber);

// Equivalent code which uses an anonymous class instead
runCalculation(new Calculation() {
    @Override
    public int calculate(int someNumber, int someOtherNumber) {
        return someNumber + someOtherNumber;
    }
})

Lambda's parameters types don't have to be fully specified and can be inferred from the interface it implements. Lambda's body can be written without a body block and a return statement if it is only an expression. Also, for those interfaces which only have a single parameter in the method, round brackets can be omitted.

// Same call as above, but with fully specified types and a body block
runCalculation((int number, int otherNumber) -> {
    return number + otherNumber;
});

// A functional interface with a method which has only a single parameter
interface StringExtender {
    String extendString(String input);
}

// Initializing a variable of this type by using a lambda
StringExtender extender = input -> input + " Extended";

Method references

It is not necessary to use lambdas when there already is a named method compatible with the interface. This method can be passed instead of a lambda using a method reference. There are several types of method references:

The code above which calls runCalculation could be replaced with the following using the method references:

runCalculation(Integer::sum);

Inheritance

Interfaces can inherit from other interfaces just like classes. Unlike classes it is allowed to inherit from multiple interfaces. However, it is possible that several interfaces have a field with the same name, in which case it becomes a single ambiguous member, which cannot be accessed.

/* Class implementing this interface must implement methods of both
ActionListener and RequestListener */
interface EventListener extends ActionListener, RequestListener {    
}

Default methods

Java SE 8 introduced default methods to interfaces which allows developers to add new methods to existing interfaces without breaking compatibility with the classes already implementing the interface. Unlike regular interface methods, default methods have a body which will get called in the case if the implementing class doesn't override it.

interface StringManipulator {
    String extendString(String input);
    
    // A method which is optional to implement
    default String shortenString(String input) {
        return input.substring(1);
    }
}

// This is a valid class despite not implementing all the methods
class PartialStringManipulator implements StringManipulator {
    @Override
    public String extendString(String input) {
        return input + " Extended";
    }
}

Static methods

Static methods is another language feature introduced in Java SE 8. They behave in exactly the same way as in the classes.

interface StringUtils {
    static String shortenByOneSymbol(String input) {
        return input.substring(1);
    }
}

StringUtils.shortenByOneSymbol("Test");

Private methods

Private methods were added in the Java 9 release. An interface can have a method with a body marked as private, in which case it will not be visible to inheriting classes. It can be called from default methods for the purposes of code reuse.

interface Logger {
    default void logError() {
        log(Level.ERROR);
    }

    default void logInfo() {
        log(Level.INFO);
    }

    private void log(Level level) {
        SystemLogger.log(level.id);
    }
}

Annotations

Annotations in Java are a way to embed metadata into code. This language feature was introduced in J2SE 5.0.

Annotation types
Java has a set of predefined annotation types, but it is allowed to define new ones. An annotation type declaration is a special type of an interface declaration. They are declared in the same way as the interfaces, except the interface keyword is preceded by the @ sign. All annotations are implicitly extended from java.lang.annotation.Annotation and cannot be extended from anything else.
@interface BlockingOperations {
}

Annotations may have the same declarations in the body as the common interfaces, in addition they are allowed to include enums and annotations. The main difference is that abstract method declarations must not have any parameters or throw any exceptions. Also they may have a default value, which is declared using the default keyword after the method name:

@interface BlockingOperations {
    boolean fileSystemOperations();
    boolean networkOperations() default false;
}

Usage of annotations
Annotations may be used in any kind of declaration, whether it is package, class (including enums), interface (including annotations), field, method, parameter, constructor, or local variable. Also they can be used with enum constants. Annotations are declared using the @ sign preceding annotation type name, after which element-value pairs are written inside brackets. All elements with no default value must be assigned a value.

@BlockingOperations(/*mandatory*/ fileSystemOperations,
/*optional*/ networkOperations = true)
void openOutputStream() { //Annotated method
}

Besides the generic form, there are two other forms to declare an annotation, which are shorthands. Marker annotation is a short form, it is used when no values are assigned to elements:
@Unused // Shorthand for @Unused()
void travelToJupiter() {
}

The other short form is called single element annotation. It is used with annotations types containing only one element or in the case when multiple elements are present, but only one elements lacks a default value. In single element annotation form the element name is omitted and only value is written instead:

/* Equivalent for @BlockingOperations(fileSystemOperations = true).
networkOperations has a default value and
does not have to be assigned a value */

@BlockingOperations(true)
void openOutputStream() {
}

Generics

Generics, or parameterized types, or parametric polymorphism is one of the major features introduced in J2SE 5.0. Before generics were introduced, it was required to declare all the types explicitly. With generics it became possible to work in a similar manner with different types without declaring the exact types. The main purpose of generics is to ensure type safety and to detect runtime errors during compilation. Unlike C#, information on the used parameters is not available at runtime due to type erasure.

Generic classes
Classes can be parameterized by adding a type variable inside angle brackets (< and >) following the class name. It makes possible the use of this type variable in class members instead of actual types. There can be more than one type variable, in which case they are declared in a comma-separated list.

It is possible to limit a type variable to a subtype of some specific class or declare an interface that must be implemented by the type. In this case the type variable is appended by the extends keyword followed by a name of the class or the interface. If the variable is constrained by both class and interface or if there are several interfaces, the class name is written first, followed by interface names with &  sign used as the delimiter.

/* This class has two type variables, T and V. T must be 
a subtype of ArrayList and implement Formattable interface */
public class Mapper<T extends ArrayList & Formattable, V> {
    public void add(T array, V item) {
        // array has add method because it is an ArrayList subclass
        array.add(item);
    }
}

When a variable of a parameterized type is declared or an instance is created, its type is written exactly in the same format as in the class header, except the actual type is written in the place of the type variable declaration.

/* Mapper is created with CustomList as T and Integer as V.
CustomList must be a subclass of ArrayList and implement Formattable */
Mapper<CustomList, Integer> mapper = new Mapper<CustomList, Integer>();

Since Java SE 7, it is possible to use a diamond (<>) in place of type arguments, in which case the latter will be inferred. The following code in Java SE 7 is equivalent to the code in the previous example:

Mapper<CustomList, Integer> mapper = new Mapper<>();

When declaring a variable for a parameterized type, it is possible to use wildcards instead of explicit type names. Wildcards are expressed by writing ? sign instead of the actual type. It is possible to limit possible types to the subclasses or superclasses of some specific class by writing the extends keyword or the super keyword correspondingly followed by the class name.

/* Any Mapper instance with CustomList as the first parameter
may be used regardless of the second one.*/
Mapper<CustomList, ?> mapper;
mapper = new Mapper<CustomList, Boolean>();
mapper = new Mapper<CustomList, Integer>();

/* Will not accept types that use anything but
a subclass of Number as the second parameter */
void addMapper(Mapper<?, ? extends Number> mapper) {
}

Generic methods and constructors
Usage of generics may be limited to some particular methods, this concept applies to constructors as well. To declare a parameterized method, type variables are written before the return type of the method in the same format as for the generic classes. In the case of constructor, type variables are declared before the constructor name.

class Mapper {
    // The class itself is not generic, the constructor is
    <T, V> Mapper(T array, V item) {
    }
}

/* This method will accept only arrays of the same type as
the searched item type or its subtype*/
static <T, V extends T> boolean contains(T item, V[] arr) {
    for (T currentItem : arr) {
        if (item.equals(currentItem)) {
            return true;
        }
    }
    return false;
}

Generic interfaces
Interfaces can be parameterized in the similar manner as the classes.

interface Expandable<T extends Number> {
    void addItem(T item);
}

// This class is parameterized
class Array<T extends Number> implements Expandable<T> {
    void addItem(T item) {
    }
}

// And this is not and uses an explicit type instead
class IntegerArray implements Expandable<Integer> {
    void addItem(Integer item) {
    }
}

See also 

 Java Platform, Standard Edition

References

 Patrick Naughton, Herbert Schildt. Java 2: The Complete Reference, third edition. The McGraw-Hill Companies, 1999.

External links

 The Java Language Specification, Third edition Authoritative description of the Java language
 

Programming language syntax
Java (programming language)